Saiyuki Reload: Burial, known in Japan as , is an original video animation (OVA) series, based on the arc of Saiyuki Reload manga "Burial" and prequel to the Saiyuki mythological adventure series written and illustrated by Kazuya Minekura, ADV Films released the first Saiyuki television series, and Geneon USA released the Saiyuki Reload and Saiyuki Reload Gunlock series. Although the Burial prequel will be license by Discotek Media on December 27, 2022, the release will be the first home video in North America, Geneon USA's parent company Dentsu alongside Studio Pierrot, produced it and the previous Saiyuki anime projects. The OVA series directed by Koichi Ohata and written by Katsuyuki Sumisawa. Saiyuki Reload: Burial the story Taking place in the past it offers a view at the Saiyuki quartet before their formation and their journey to the west.

Saiyuki Reload: Burial OVA, was first release in Japan on April 27, 2007.

GARDEN performed the opening theme title "Late-Show" who provided music for two "Saiyuki RELOAD image albums"! The original author Kazuya Minekura wrote the lyrics for this song, which summarizes the image of the work, The maxi CD released on April 25, 2007 published and distribute by Frontier Works. the ending theme performed by three popular voice actors Sanzo (Toshihiko Seki), Goku (Sōichirō Hoshi), and Gojo (Hiroaki Hirata) will sing a dramatic moon-themed song in addition, two song by Sanzo, Goku, and Gojyo from "Saiyuki RELOAD Vocal Album" re-recorded as a coupling. Also includes the ED theme "shiny moon" a cappella ver. and an instrumental ver., totaling five songs, following the flow of the previously released "Saiyuki RELOAD Vocal Album". The maxi CD released on May 23, 2007

Plot
Twenty years ago, Koumyou Sanzo visited Zenokuji Temple where Godai Sanzo resides.
Godai Sanzo realizes that he is suffering from a serious illness and does not have much time left to live.
In the presence of Koumyou, he elected a candidate for the official successor of Mutenkyomon,
Kenmura, who raises an objection to the selection, suppresses Godai to the floor. Then, on the day of the final exam, a crow cried. Four years after Kinzan Temple burned down twelve years ago, like a corpse. Genjo Sanzo went to Shayoden to have an audience with the Sanbutsujin.
He was looking for a clue to the Holy Heaven Sutra, but from the three Buddha gods, He is given a new life and will stay at Keiunin.
There he met Daisojo Makukaku, but decided to leave again late at night. An opposition party aiming for Sanzo's life attacks Keiunin. 
Gogyozan in search of a monster that has been sealed for 500 years, When Sanzo climbs up to the top, he meets a child who is the owner of the voice.
Sanzo takes him down the mountain and secretly lets him live in Keiunin. From the three Buddha gods, the children are legendary demons with powers equal to those of gods. He is told that he is the "Symbol of Chaos" Saiten Daisho Son Goku. That night, Goku was found by a monk and cornered. Gojyo and Hakkai are heretical beings who are neither human nor youkai. The two meet by chance and live together until Hakkai's injury heals. An old friend of Gojyo's, Enri, appears there for the first time in a year, and invites Gojyo to team up with a band of thieves. A few days later, Enri betrays the organization and becomes a prisoner, and asks Gojyo to take over the hostage while he steals the temple as his last job, Finally, Sanzo's party is assembled, and a new story that continues to the present is spun.

Cast

Release 

The first volume of the Special Edition released on April 27, 2007, the special edition for Volume two released on September 28. The third was supposed to release on December 28, 2007 but Due to production reasons, the volume of Special Edition release date has been changed and distribute on March 28, 2008. 

A special edition of all three volumes publish on February 7, 2008.

Saiyuki Reload: Burial Volume one "Sanzo Chapter" Standard Edition released on July 10, 2007. 

The Volume two "Son Goku Chapter" Standard Edition released on December 21, 2007 and Volume 3 ~ Chapter of Gojyo & Hakkai ~ Standard Edition released on May 23, 2008. 

On October 24, 2012 "Saiyuki Reload: Burial" OVA special DVD-BOX Released by Frontier Works and  Geneon. "Saiyuki Reload: Burial" Genjo Sanzo action figure release on October 25, 2008.

A Blu-ray of all three volumes of "Saiyuki Reload: Burial (OAV) " has been released on December 21, 2018.

Discotek Media will release the three-episode OAV on Blu-Ray Disc on December 27, 2022.

References

External links 
 Saiyuki Reload: Burial" official website 

2007 anime OVAs
Arms Corporation
Dentsu
Discotek Media
Pierrot (company)
Saiyuki (manga)